Pikroprion is a genus of moths of the family Notodontidae. It consists of only one species, Pikroprion sullivani, which is endemic to the Choco habitat along the western slopes of the Andes in Ecuador and Colombia.

The length of the forewings is 14.5–16 mm for males and 15.5–17 mm for females. The forewings are dark chocolate brown with three white maculations. There is a translucent white central area on the hindwings and a moderately wide, dark chocolate-brown outer margin.

Etymology
The species is named in honor of J. Bolling Sullivan.

References

Notodontidae of South America
Monotypic moth genera